Völkerball (German for "Dodgeball";  "Peoples' ball") is a live album and DVD by German rock band Rammstein. It was released on 17 November 2006 in Europe, 19 December 2006 in Canada and on 18 September 2007 in the US. The album was advertised within media by the "Ich will" live video featured on the DVD and "Mann gegen Mann" single.

The standard edition-packaging comes in both CD-sized and DVD-sized formats. The special edition features two DVDs and one CD. The extra DVD comes with the documentary Anakonda im Netz and the Making of Reise, Reise. The limited edition has two DVDs, two CDs and a photobook. The logo is derived from that of the 1980 Summer Olympics in Moscow.

Versions

Standard edition: two-disc set

 DVD, 140-minute concert footage filmed in: Nîmes, Tokyo, London, and Moscow
 Audio CD, 75-minute live audio recorded in Nîmes
 Released in both CD-sized packaging and DVD-sized Packaging

Special edition: three-disc set

 DVD, 140-minute concert footage filmed in: Nîmes, Tokyo, London, and Moscow
 Audio CD, 75-minute live audio recorded in Nîmes
 DVD, 90-minute documentary: Anakonda im Netz and Making of Reise, Reise
 Released in both CD-sized packaging and DVD-sized Packaging

Limited 'tourbook' edition: four-disc set

 DVD, 140-minute concert footage filmed in: Nîmes, Tokyo, London, and Moscow
 Two Audio CDs, the entire live-audio-recording of the concert in Nîmes (105 minutes, dead airs were edited)
 DVD, 90-minute documentary: Anakonda im Netz and Making of Reise, Reise
 190-page special edition, numbered tour  photobook
 Only 40,000 copies were produced, each one marked with a unique serial number.

Track listing

Release history

Charts

Year-end

Certifications

Reception
Völkerball was nominated for Echo Awards 2007 in the Best DVD category, which was won by Pink Floyd's Pulse.

Personnel 
Till Lindemann – lead vocals, harmonica on "Los"
Richard Kruspe – lead guitar, backing vocals, acoustic guitar on "Los"
Paul Landers – rhythm guitar, backing vocals, acoustic guitar on "Los"
Oliver Riedel – bass, backing vocals on "Stein um Stein" and "Sehnsucht"
Christoph Schneider – drums
Christian Lorenz – keyboards

References

External links

 

Rammstein albums
2006 video albums
2006 live albums
German-language albums
Live video albums
Universal Music Group live albums
Universal Music Group video albums
Albums recorded at the Brixton Academy